Mehrauli Archaeological Park is an archaeological area spread over 200 acre in the Mehrauli neighbourhood of the South Delhi district of Delhi, India, adjacent to the Qutub Minar (a World Heritage Site) and the Qutb complex. It consists of over 100 historically significant monuments. It is the only area in Delhi known for 1,000 years of continuous occupation, and includes the ruins of Lal Kot built by Tomar Rajputs in 1060 CE, making it the oldest extant fort of Delhi, and architectural relics of subsequent period, rule of Khalji dynasty, Tughlaq dynasty, Lodhi dynasty of Delhi Sultanate, Mughal Empire, and the British Raj.

Overview
The region contains sites like Tomb of Balban, ca 1287 CE, wherein a true arch and the true dome were built for the first time in India, Jamali Kamali Mosque and Tomb of Maulana Jamali Kamali (Jamali Kamboh), built 1526 - 1535 CE, Quli Khan's Tomb, Gandhak ki Baoli, Rajon Ki Baoli, a stepwell, and Madhi Masjid. Other near by monuments Jahaz Mahal, Zafar Mahal of Bahadur Shah II alias Lal Mahal, Hauz-i-Shamsi and Tomb of Adham Khan. Pillars and remains of several monuments , Jharna which is like a pleasure garden of late Mughals are also lay scattered in the park.

Redevelopment and conservation

The redevelopment of the area as an archaeological park and conservation of important structures started in 1997, in collaboration between Delhi Tourism and Transportation Development Corporation (DTTDC), the State Department of Archaeology, the Delhi Development Authority (DDA) and the Indian National Trust for Art and Cultural Heritage (INTACH), which first started  systematic documentation of structures in the area and also started conducting heritage walks since 2000.

Over the years, INTACH has restored some 40 monuments in the Park and added signages, heritage trails, and sandstone trail-markers.

Notable monuments and structures

See also
 Qutb complex
 History of Delhi
 Baolis of Mehrauli
 List of Monuments of National Importance in Delhi

References

 Mehrauli Archaeological Park Conservation  INTACH

External links
 Heritage Walks: Mehrauli Archaeological Park at INTACH
 
 Monuments of Delhi
 Mehrauli Archaeological Park. World History Encyclopedia. Retrieved from https://www.worldhistory.org/article/1736/mehrauli-archaeological-park/

Archaeological sites in Delhi
Parks in Delhi
Mehrauli
History of Delhi
Archaeological parks
Protected areas with year of establishment missing